Arsine (IUPAC name: arsane) is an inorganic compound with the formula AsH3. This flammable, pyrophoric, and highly toxic pnictogen hydride gas is one of the simplest compounds of arsenic. Despite its lethality, it finds some applications in the semiconductor industry and for the synthesis of organoarsenic compounds. The term arsine is commonly used to describe a class of organoarsenic compounds of the formula AsH3−xRx, where R = aryl or alkyl. For example, As(C6H5)3, called triphenylarsine, is referred to as "an arsine".

General properties
At its standard state, arsine is a colorless, denser-than-air gas that is slightly soluble in water (20% at 20 °C) and in many organic solvents as well. Whereas arsine itself is odorless, owing to its oxidation by air, it is possible to smell a slight garlic or fish-like scent when the compound is present above 0.5ppm. This compound is kinetically stable: at room temperature it decomposes only slowly. At temperatures of ca. 230 °C, decomposition to arsenic and hydrogen is sufficiently rapid to be the basis of the Marsh Test (see below). Similar to stibine, the decomposition of arsine is autocatalytic, as the arsenic freed during the reaction acts as a catalyst for the same reaction. Several other factors, such as humidity, presence of light and certain catalysts (namely alumina) facilitate the rate of decomposition.

AsH3 is a pyramidal molecule with H–As–H angles of 91.8° and three equivalent As–H bonds, each of 1.519 Å length.

Discovery and synthesis
AsH3 is generally prepared by the reaction of As3+ sources with H− equivalents.
4 AsCl3 + 3 NaBH4 → 4 AsH3 + 3 NaCl + 3 BCl3
As reported in 1775, Carl Scheele reduced arsenic(III) oxide with zinc in the presence of acid. This reaction is a prelude to the Marsh test, described below.

Alternatively, sources of As3− react with protonic reagents to also produce this gas. Zinc arsenide and sodium arsenide are suitable precursors:
Zn3As2 + 6 H+ → 2 AsH3 + 3 Zn2+
Na3As + 3 HBr → AsH3 + 3 NaBr

Reactions
The understanding of the chemical properties of AsH3 is well developed and can be anticipated based on an average of the behavior of pnictogen counterparts, such as  PH3 and SbH3.

Thermal decomposition
Typical for a heavy hydride (e.g., SbH3, H2Te, SnH4), AsH3 is unstable with respect to its elements. In other words, AsH3 is stable kinetically but not thermodynamically.
2 AsH3 → 3 H2 + 2 As

This decomposition reaction is the basis of the Marsh Test described below, which detects the elemental As.

Oxidation
Continuing the analogy to SbH3, AsH3 is readily oxidized by concentrated O2 or the dilute O2 concentration in air:
2 AsH3 + 3 O2 → As2O3 + 3 H2O

Arsine will react violently in presence of strong oxidizing agents, such as potassium permanganate, sodium hypochlorite, or nitric acid.

Precursor to metallic derivatives
AsH3 is used as a precursor to metal complexes of "naked" (or "nearly naked") As. Illustrative is the dimanganese species [(C5H5)Mn(CO)2]2AsH, wherein the Mn2AsH core is planar.

Gutzeit test
A characteristic test for arsenic involves the reaction of AsH3 with Ag+, called the Gutzeit test for arsenic. Although this test has become obsolete in analytical chemistry, the underlying reactions further illustrate the affinity of AsH3 for "soft" metal cations. In the Gutzeit test, AsH3 is generated by reduction of aqueous arsenic compounds, typically arsenites, with Zn in the presence of H2SO4. The evolved gaseous AsH3 is then exposed to AgNO3 either as powder or as a solution. With solid AgNO3, AsH3 reacts to produce yellow Ag4AsNO3, whereas AsH3 reacts with a solution of AgNO3 to give black Ag3As.

Acid-base reactions
The acidic properties of the As–H bond are often exploited. Thus, AsH3 can be deprotonated:
AsH3 + NaNH2 → NaAsH2 + NH3

Upon reaction with the aluminium trialkyls, AsH3 gives the trimeric [R2AlAsH2]3, where R = (CH3)3C. This reaction is relevant to the mechanism by which GaAs forms from AsH3 (see below).

AsH3 is generally considered non-basic, but it can be protonated by superacids to give isolable salts of the tetrahedral species [AsH4]+.

Reaction with halogen compounds
Reactions of arsine with the halogens (fluorine and chlorine) or some of their compounds, such as nitrogen trichloride, are extremely dangerous and can result in explosions.

Catenation
In contrast to the behavior of PH3, AsH3 does not form stable chains, although diarsine (or diarsane) H2As–AsH2, and even triarsane H2As–As(H)–AsH2 have been detected. The diarsine is unstable above −100 °C.

Applications

Microelectronics applications
AsH3 is used in the synthesis of semiconducting materials related to microelectronics and solid-state lasers. Related to phosphorus, arsenic is an n-dopant for silicon and germanium. More importantly, AsH3 is used to make the semiconductor GaAs by chemical vapor deposition (CVD) at 700–900 °C:
Ga(CH3)3 + AsH3 → GaAs + 3 CH4

For microelectronic applications, arsine can be provided via a sub-atmospheric gas source. In this type of gas package, the arsine is adsorbed on a solid microporous adsorbent inside a gas cylinder. This method allows the gas to be stored without pressure, significantly reducing the risk of an arsine gas leak from the cylinder. With this apparatus, arsine is obtained by applying vacuum to the gas cylinder valve outlet. For semiconductor manufacturing, this method is feasible, as processes such as ion implantation operate under high vacuum.

Chemical warfare
Since before WWII AsH3 was proposed as a possible chemical warfare weapon. The gas is colorless, almost odorless, and 2.5 times denser than air, as required for a blanketing effect sought in chemical warfare. It is also lethal in concentrations far lower than those required to smell its garlic-like scent. In spite of these characteristics, arsine was never officially used as a weapon, because of its high flammability and its lower efficacy when compared to the non-flammable alternative phosgene. On the other hand, several organic compounds based on arsine, such as lewisite (β-chlorovinyldichloroarsine), adamsite (diphenylaminechloroarsine), Clark 1 (diphenylchloroarsine) and Clark 2 (diphenylcyanoarsine) have been effectively developed for use in chemical warfare.

Forensic science and the Marsh test
AsH3 is also well known in forensic science because it is a chemical intermediate in the detection of arsenic poisoning. The old (but extremely sensitive) Marsh test generates AsH3 in the presence of arsenic. This procedure, published in 1836 by James Marsh, is based upon treating an As-containing sample of a victim's body (typically the stomach contents) with As-free zinc and dilute sulfuric acid: if the sample contains arsenic, gaseous arsine will form. The gas is swept into a glass tube and decomposed by means of heating around 250–300 °C. The presence of As is indicated by formation of a deposit in the heated part of the equipment. On the other hand, the appearance of a black mirror deposit in the cool part of the equipment indicates the presence of antimony (the highly unstable SbH3 decomposes even at low temperatures).

The Marsh test was widely used by the end of the 19th century and the start of the 20th; nowadays more sophisticated techniques such as atomic spectroscopy, inductively coupled plasma, and x-ray fluorescence analysis are employed in the forensic field. Though neutron activation analysis was used to detect trace levels of arsenic in the mid 20th century, it has since fallen out of use in modern forensics.

Toxicology

The toxicity of arsine is distinct from that of other arsenic compounds. The main route of exposure is by inhalation, although poisoning after skin contact has also been described. Arsine attacks hemoglobin in the red blood cells, causing them to be destroyed by the body.

The first signs of exposure, which can take several hours to become apparent, are headaches, vertigo, and nausea, followed by the symptoms of haemolytic anaemia (high levels of unconjugated bilirubin), haemoglobinuria and nephropathy. In severe cases, the damage to the kidneys can be long-lasting.

Exposure to arsine concentrations of 250 ppm is rapidly fatal: concentrations of 25–30 ppm are fatal for 30 min exposure, and concentrations of 10 ppm can be fatal at longer exposure times. Symptoms of poisoning appear after exposure to concentrations of 0.5 ppm. There is little information on the chronic toxicity of arsine, although it is reasonable to assume that, in common with other arsenic compounds, a long-term exposure could lead to arsenicosis.

Arsine can cause pneumonia in two different ways either the "extensive edema of the acute stage may become diffusely infiltrated with polymorphonuclear leucocytes, and the edema may change to ringed with leucocytes, their epithelium degenerated, their walls infiltrated, and each bronchiole the center of a small focus or nodule of pneumonic consolidation", and In the second Case "the areas involved are practically always the anterior tips of the middle and upper lobes, while the posterior portions of these lobes and the whole of the lower lobes present an air-containing and emphysematous condition, sometimes with slight congestion, sometimes with none."  which can result in death. 

It is classified as an extremely hazardous substance in the United States as defined in Section 302 of the U.S. Emergency Planning and Community Right-to-Know Act (42 U.S.C. 11002), and is subject to strict reporting requirements by facilities which produce, store, or use it in significant quantities.

Occupational exposure limits

See also
Cacodylic acid
Cacodyl oxide
Devarda's alloy, also used to produce arsine in the lab
List of highly toxic gases
Marsh test, first used to analyze AsH3
James Marsh, invented in 1836 the test now bearing his name
Stibine
Scheele's Green, a pigment popularly used in the early 19th century

References

External links
International Chemical Safety Card 0222
IARC Monograph "Arsenic and Arsenic Compounds"
NIOSH Pocket Guide to Chemical Hazards

Data on arsine from Air Liquide

Arsenic(−III) compounds
IARC Group 1 carcinogens
Industrial gases
Metal hydrides
Blood agents